Dairy Gulch is a valley in San Mateo County, California. It contains a stream which is a tributary of San Gregorio Creek.

See also
List of watercourses in the San Francisco Bay Area

References

Valleys of San Mateo County, California
Landforms of the San Francisco Bay Area
Valleys of California